The 2013 Army Black Knights football team represented the United States Military Academy as an independent in the 2013 NCAA Division I FBS football season. The Black Knights were led by fifth-year head coach Rich Ellerson and played their home games at Michie Stadium. Following the loss to Navy on December 14 and finishing the season 3–9, Ellerson was fired.

Schedule

Game summaries

Morgan State

at Ball State

Stanford

Wake Forest

vs. Louisiana Tech

at Boston College

Eastern Michigan

at Temple

at Air Force

WKU

at Hawaii

vs. Navy

References

Army
Army Black Knights football seasons
Army Black Knights football